Fareham Hockey Club is a field hockey club that is based at The Henry Cort Community College, in Fareham, Hampshire. The founding of the club is unknown but it was in existence by 1902 when known as the Fareham and District Hockey Club.

Teams
The club runs seven men's teams  with the first XI playing in the Men's England Hockey League Division One South and three women's teams  with the first XI playing in the Women's South League.

Major Honours
1982–83 Men's National League Runner-up
2019–20 Men's Cup Runner-Up

References

English field hockey clubs
Field hockey clubs established in 1902
1902 establishments in England
Sports clubs in Hampshire